Benítez is a municipality of Sucre, Venezuela. The capital is El Pilar.

Municipalities of Sucre (state)